Eagle Creek may refer to:

Places

Canada 
Eagle Creek (Burnaby), a river in British Columbia
Eagle Creek (Saskatchewan), a river in Saskatchewan
Eagle Creek Regional Park, a park in Saskatchewan
Rural Municipality of Eagle Creek No. 376, a municipality in Saskatchewan
Eagle Creek (electoral district), a former provincial electoral district in Saskatchewan

United States 
Eagle Creek Formation, a geologic formation in Alaska
Eagle Creek (Arizona), a river at the base of the White Mountain Range in Arizona
Eagle Creek State Recreation Area, a state park in Shelby County, Illinois
Eagle Creek Township, Gallatin County, Illinois, a township in Gallatin County, Illinois
Eagle Creek Township, Lake County, Indiana, a township in Lake County, Indiana
Eagle Creek Airpark, a public use airport in Indianapolis, Indiana
Eagle Creek Park, a city park in Indianapolis, Indiana located along the Eagle Creek in Indiana
Eagle Creek (Kentucky), a tributary of the Kentucky River in Kentucky
Eagle Creek (Niobrara River tributary), a stream in Holt County, Nebraska
Eagle Creek (Multnomah County, Oregon), a tributary of the Columbia River in Oregon
Eagle Creek, Oregon, an unincorporated community in Clackamas County, Oregon
Eagle Creek (Oregon) (disambiguation), many physical features in Oregon 
Eagle Creek waterfalls, waterfalls on a  tributary of the Columbia River in Oregon

Eagle Creek (South Carolina), a tributary of the Ashley River (South Carolina)

Businesses 
Eagle Creek (company), a luggage manufacturing company in Carlsbad, California
Eagle Creek Golf Club, an eighteen-hole golf course in Orlando, Florida

See also 
 Eagle River (disambiguation)
 Eagle Lake (disambiguation)
 Eagle (disambiguation)